The Thai Ambassador in Bern is the official representative of the Government in Bangkok to the Government of Switzerland, the Holy See and Liechtenstein.

List of representatives

 Switzerland–Thailand relations

References 

 
Switzerland
Thailand